Terry Linn Stotts (born November 25, 1957) is an American professional basketball coach and former player. He most recently served as head coach of the Portland Trail Blazers of the National Basketball Association (NBA).

After a playing as a forward in Europe and the Continental Basketball Association (CBA), where he was coached by George Karl, Stotts became a part of Karl's coaching staff on multiple teams in the CBA and NBA. He later got opportunities as a head coach for the Atlanta Hawks and Milwaukee Bucks, before helping the Dallas Mavericks win the 2011 NBA championship as an assistant coach.

Early life and college career
Born in Cedar Falls, Iowa, Stotts grew up in Illinois, Wisconsin, Guam, and Indiana and graduated from Bloomington High School North in Bloomington, Indiana in 1976. Stotts was a member of the 1976 Indiana All-Star Team.

Stotts was a starter in all his four seasons with the University of Oklahoma Sooners basketball team and was an Academic All-American selection in his junior and senior seasons and an All-Big Eight Conference selection in his senior season. He graduated from Oklahoma in 1980 with a B.S. in zoology and a Master in Business Administration from Oklahoma in 1988 on a postgraduate scholarship from the NCAA.

Playing career
Stotts was a second round selection of the Houston Rockets in the 1980 NBA draft, but he could not find a place on the team. He began his professional playing career in Italy before joining George Karl's Continental Basketball Association (CBA) team, the Montana Golden Nuggets, in the early 1980s. He played for the team for three seasons. He then returned to Europe for several seasons, playing in Spain (CB Estudiantes) and France.

Coaching career

Early career with George Karl and the CBA
After retiring as a player, Stotts joined Karl's coaching staff as an assistant with the CBA's Albany Patroons in 1990–91. During his first year, he helped lead the Patroons to an all-time CBA-best 50–6 record. Stotts then coached the CBA's Fort Wayne Fury for one season before rejoining Karl as part of his staff on the Seattle SuperSonics in the NBA. He then moved with Karl to the Milwaukee Bucks in 1998.

Atlanta Hawks
In 2002, he decided to part ways with Karl and joined the Atlanta Hawks as an assistant coach. He was promoted to head coach 27 games into the season after Lon Kruger was fired. Stotts led the Hawks on a 24-31 run before he was let go and returned to the assistant coaching ranks with the Golden State Warriors.

Milwaukee Bucks
In 2005, he became the head coach of the Milwaukee Bucks. He guided them to the playoffs in his first season, but was fired towards the end of his second season on March 14, 2007.

Dallas Mavericks
He was hired as an assistant coach for the Dallas Mavericks shortly after Rick Carlisle was hired as head coach in September 2008. He was credited for coordinating the Mavericks' offense that was one of the most efficient in the league in 2010–11, when they won the NBA title.

Portland Trail Blazers

The Portland Trail Blazers hired Stotts as their head coach on August 7, 2012. The Blazers went 33–49 in Stotts's first year, losing their final 13 games to drop out of the playoff race.

In Stotts's second season with the Trail Blazers, he coached the team to an overall record of 54–28. They beat the Houston Rockets in the first round of the NBA playoffs with a buzzer-beating three-point shot by Damian Lillard to advance to the second round, but fell short to the eventual NBA champion San Antonio Spurs in the second round, ultimately losing in five games.

In Stotts's third season, he led the team to an overall record of 51–31. After sustaining some key injuries, they fell to the Memphis Grizzlies in the first round of the NBA playoffs 4–1.

Despite losing four of his starters, including star forward LaMarcus Aldridge, in the off-season, Stotts's fourth season saw him lead the Trail Blazers to the second round, after defeating the Los Angeles Clippers in the first round. In the second round, Portland played the top-seeded Golden State Warriors to a very competitive five-game series, but eventually lost 4–1. On May 16, 2016, Stotts agreed on a contract extension with the Trail Blazers.

In the 2018–19 season, Stotts led the Trail Blazers to a 53–29 regular season record and their deepest playoff run in almost 20 years. Portland defeated the Oklahoma City Thunder 4–1 and Denver Nuggets 4–3 in the first two rounds but were swept by the two-time defending NBA champion Golden State Warriors in the Conference Finals.

On June 4, 2021, after their fourth first-round exit in five years, Stotts and the Blazers mutually agreed to part ways. He left the club with the second-most wins in franchise history with 402.

Head coaching record

|-
| align="left"|Atlanta
| align="left"|
| 55||24||31|||| align="center"|5th in Central|||—||—||—||—
| align="center"|Missed playoffs
|-
| align="left"|Atlanta
| align="left"|
| 82||28||54|||| align="center"|7th in Central|||—||—||—||—
| align="center"|Missed playoffs
|-
| align="left"|Milwaukee
| align="left"|
| 82||40||42|||| align="center"|5th in Central||5||1||4||
| align="center"|Lost in First Round
|-
|-
| align="left"|Milwaukee
| align="left"|
| 64||23||41|||| align="center"|(fired)|||—||—||—||—
| align="center"|—
|-
| align="left"|Portland
| align="left"|
| 82||33||49|||| align="center"|4th in Northwest|||—||—||—||—
| align="center"|Missed playoffs
|-
| align="left"|Portland
| align="left"|
| 82||54||28|||| align="center"|2nd in Northwest||11||5||6||
| align="center"|Lost in Conference Semifinals
|-
| align="left"|Portland
| align="left"|
| 82||51||31|||| align="center"|1st in Northwest||5||1||4||
| align="center"|Lost in First Round
|-
| align="left"|Portland
| align="left"|
| 82||44||38|||| align="center"|2nd in Northwest||11||5||6||
| align="center"|Lost in Conference Semifinals
|-
| align="left"|Portland
| align="left"|
| 82||41||41|||| align="center"|3rd in Northwest||4||0||4||
| align="center"|Lost in First Round
|-
| align="left"|Portland
| align="left"|
| 82||49||33|||| align="center"|1st in Northwest||4||0||4||
| align="center"|Lost in First Round
|-
| align="left"|Portland
| align="left"|
| 82||53||29|||| align="center"|2nd in Northwest||16||8||8||
| align="center"|Lost in Conference Finals
|-
| align="left"|Portland
| align="left"|
| 74||35||39|||| align="center"|4th in Northwest||5||1||4||
| align="center"|Lost in First round
|-
| align="left"|Portland
| align="left"|
| 72||42||30|||| align="center"|3rd in Northwest||6||2||4||
| align="center"|Lost in First round
|- class="sortbottom"
| align="center" colspan="2"|Career||1,003||517||486|||| ||67||23||44||||

Personal life
Stotts lives with his wife Jan in Lake Oswego, Oregon. Outside of coaching, he enjoys cycling, traveling and golf.

References

External links
 Stotts's biography on NBA.com
 Coaching statistics on Basketball-Reference.com

1957 births
Living people
Albany Patroons players
American expatriate basketball people in France
American expatriate basketball people in Italy
American expatriate basketball people in Spain
American men's basketball coaches
American men's basketball players
Atlanta Hawks head coaches
Basketball coaches from Indiana
Basketball coaches from Iowa
Basketball players from Indiana
Basketball players from Iowa
CB Estudiantes players
Chorale Roanne Basket players
Continental Basketball Association coaches
Dallas Mavericks assistant coaches
Golden State Warriors assistant coaches
Houston Rockets draft picks
Liga ACB players
Milwaukee Bucks assistant coaches
Milwaukee Bucks head coaches
Montana Golden Nuggets players
Oklahoma Sooners men's basketball players
Pallacanestro Cantù players
People from Cedar Falls, Iowa
Portland Trail Blazers head coaches
Seattle SuperSonics assistant coaches
Sportspeople from Bloomington, Indiana
Forwards (basketball)